Dutch colonial architecture is the type of architecture prevalent in the construction of homes, commercial buildings, and outbuildings in areas settled by the Dutch from the early 17th to early 19th century in the area encompassing the former Dutch colony of New Netherland.

In the early 17th century, the original portion of most dwellings started out, as a matter of immediate need, as simple one-story dwellings constructed primarily of local available material. When available the house would be constructed of fieldstone such as the Abraham Manee House on Staten Island. The wood for the joists and rafters were trimmed with an adze from trees felled on or near the property.

The ceiling and interior walls when constructed after the initial construction were usually framed then plastered with clay from local deposits, mixed with horse hair for strength, over rough trimmed wood laths.

Common characteristics of Dutch colonial architecture are they typically, but not always had Gambrel roofs with flared eaves, Dutch doors and brick chimneys built at the gable ends.

References

New Netherland
Colonial architecture in the United States
American architectural styles
Dutch colonial architecture